K. P. Ramanunni (Malayalam:കെ.പി.രാമനുണ്ണി) is a novelist and short-story writer from Kerala, India. His first novel Sufi Paranja Katha (What the Sufi Said) won the Kerala Sahitya Akademi Award in 1995 and the novel Daivathinte Pusthakam (God's Own Book) won the Kendra Sahitya Akademi Award in 2017. Jeevithathinte Pusthakam (Book of Life) won the 2011 Vayalar Award.

Life

It took nearly four years for Ramanunni to produce his next novel, Charama Varshikam (Death Anniversary).Oxford University Press has brought out his second novel Charamavarshikam in English as Death Anniversary. And five years more to write his next novel Jeevithathinte Pusthakam (Book of life). The theme of the novel is woven around the life of a bank officer in the grip of amnesia. It was urban hypocrisy and the rural benevolence that he tried to portray in it. Experiences from his own life had added colour to the story, he says. Critics have hailed Jeevithathinte Pusthakam as a significant contribution to Malayalam literature. ‘DaivathintePusthakam’ won the National literary award of India in 2017. (Kendra Sahitya Akademi Award.) The novel had also received Sadbhavana Award, Basheer Award Abudhabi Sakthi Award and Asghar Ali Engineer National Award.

Ramanunni’s short stories which appeared in various leading Malayalam journals have been published in fifteen collections. His very first short story Shavasamskaram won the Prize for the best Short story from Samastha Kerala SahityaParishad.  Another Short Story Mukalakshanam was awarded the V.P. Sivakumar Smaraka Keli Award. The Shrot Story JatiChodikkuka won the Padmarajan Puraskaram and Katha award, New Delhi. The Short Story Manushyan Mrugam Eninganne was awarded Bahrain Keraleya Samajam Prize. His collection of short stories PurushaVilapam won AbudabiSakthi Award and the Short Story collection Jadhi Chodikukka won Kalakkad Award. His selected Short Story collection won the C.V. Sreeraman Award of 2009 & T.V. Kochubava Award of 2009. 

Ramanunni has participated in many National and International Literary Seminars. As a senior fiction writer in Malayalam he has represented the language in the international Katha Seminar in New Delhi. He has visited America three times on invitation from Federation of Kerala Associations in North America. He has also visited England, Europe, U.A.E, Oman, Bahrain, Qatar, Bangkok, Iraq, Jordhan, Egypt and Singapore on invitation from different Malayalee organizations. K.P. Ramanunni was the member of writers’ delegation sent to China by Kendra Sahitya Akademi in 2007. K.P. Ramanunni was the Malayalam advisory board member of Sahitya Akademi, New Delhi. He was also the member of Kerala Sahitya Akademi and curriculum committee. Now he is the governing body member of Malayalam Mission.
 
Ramanunni is an activist working in the field of communal harmony and Mother tongue movement in Kerala. He led so many campaigns against the communal division of the society.  He has addressed the communal problems from the standpoint of a real believer. His initiative in this field has been duly acknowledged throughout India.

Works

Novels
Sufi Paranja Katha (What the Sufi Said)
Charama Varshikam (Death Anniversary)
Jeevithathinte Pusthakam (Book Of Life)
Daivathinte Pusthakam (God's Own Book)

Short story collections
Vidhathavinte Chiri
Vendapettavante Kurish
Purusha Vilapam
Jathi Chodikkuka
Selected Short Stories of K.P. Ramanunni
achyuthammama
Entrance Ezhuthunnakutty (Balasahityam)
Priyappetta Kathakal
Fokso
Grama Kathakal
Prakasamparathunna Aankutti
Aval Mozhiyukayanu
Tanthappratheyyam
Pranayaparvam
Kurks

Collection of Essays
1. Kriminal Kuttamakunna Rathi
2. Shirshasanam
3. Anubhavam, Orma, Yathra
4. Jeevitham Oru Arthikarante Kayyil
5. Oruviswasiyude Mathethara Chinthakal
6. Manas Malayalam

Screenplay
Sufi Paranja Katha

Awards
K. P. Ramanunni has won several awards and recognitions for his contributions towards Malayalam literature:

 Kendra Sahitya Academy Award (2017 for Daivathinte Pusthakam)
 Kerala Sahitya Akademi Award for Novel (1995 for Sufi Paranja Katha)
 Vayalar Award (2011 for Jeevithathinte Pusthakam)
 Edasseri Award (1989 for Sufi Paranja Katha)
 Padmarajan Award (1999 for Jaathi Chodikkuka),* Vayalar Award (2011 for Jeevithathinte Pusthakam),
 Abu Dhabi Sakthi Award (Story) (for Purushavilapam)
 Abu Dhabi Sakthi Award (Novel) (2015 for Daivathinte Pusthakam)
 V.P. Sivakumar Smaraka Keli Award
 Bharathiya bhasa parishad National Award
 Dr. Asghar Ali Engineer Memorial Lifetime Achievement Award
 Malayatoor Award 
 Basheer Award
 Katha Award
 Bahrain Keraleeya Samajam Award
 A. P. Kalakkadu Award
 C. V. Sreeraman Award
 T.V. Kochubava Award

References

External links
A Perception of Life

1955 births
Living people
Malayalam-language writers
Malayalam novelists
Recipients of the Sahitya Akademi Award in Malayalam
Recipients of the Kerala Sahitya Akademi Award
Malayalam screenwriters
Malabar Christian College alumni
Malayalam short story writers
Indian male novelists
Indian male screenwriters
Indian male short story writers
People from Malappuram district
Novelists from Kerala
20th-century Indian short story writers
20th-century Indian novelists
Screenwriters from Kerala
20th-century Indian male writers
21st-century Indian novelists
Recipients of the Abu Dhabi Sakthi Award